Concorde De Luxe Resort is a five star hotel in Lara, Antalya, Turkey. It won the "Europe's All-inclusive Resort", the "Turkey's All-inclusive Resort" and the "Turkey's Leading Spa Resort" awards in 2008.

References

External links
www.concordehotel.com.tr Official Site
www.concorde-deluxe.de Official German Site

Hotels in Antalya